Rex Paulain Jack Barrat (1914–1974) was a French artist known especially for his landscape paintings. He was born in Varzy (Nièvre, France) and died in Créteil.

Artworks
Barrat was known for his landscapes of Burgundy. His works belong to several public collections, including the Musée de la Loire in Cosne-sur-Loire and the public collection of the city Varzy, France.

Notes

External sources
Akoun 2004, page 67
Artprice
Musée de la Loire in Cosne-sur-Loire, France

1914 births
1974 deaths
People from Nièvre
20th-century French painters
20th-century French male artists
French male painters
Modern painters